Side Pony is the fifth studio album by Lake Street Dive. It was released through Nonesuch Records on February 19, 2016 both as a CD and on vinyl and various electronic formats.

Reception

Writing for Allmusic, music critic Matt Collar wrote "they've honed their sound even further, zeroing in on a vintage-inspired, '60s soul aesthetic." The Wall Street Journal called the album "An utterly twang-free collection that includes a few shimmering dance tracks as well as 1960s-style rock, soul and R&B numbers" 

The album debuted at No. 1 on three Billboard''' charts - Top Rock Albums, Folk Albums and Alternative Albums charts. It also debuted at No. 29 on the Billboard'' 200, and No. 11 on Top Album Sales, with 16,000 copies sold in the first week.

Accolades

Track listing

Personnel
Rachael Price – lead vocals
Mike “McDuck” Olson – guitar, trumpet, organ, piano and vocals
Bridget Kearney – bass, electric bass, piano and vocals 
Mike Calabrese – drums, percussion, organ and vocals 
Dave Cobb – guitar

Technical personnel
Dave Cobb – production
Darrell Thorp assisted by Mike Stankiewicz and Eddie Spear – engineering and mixing
Pete Lyman – mastering at Infrasonic Sound, Los Angeles

Design
Jeri Heiden and Nick Steinhardt for SMOG Design – art direction and design
Danny Clinch – photography

Charts

References

2016 albums
Lake Street Dive albums